Prince Ernst Heinrich of Saxony, Duke of Saxony (Ernst Heinrich Ferdinand Franz Joseph Otto Maria Melchiades; 9 December 1896 – 14 June 1971) was a member of the Saxon Royal Family. Ernst Heinrich was the youngest son of the last King of Saxony, Frederick Augustus III, and his wife Archduchess Luise of Austria, Princess of Tuscany. From 1923 through 1945, Ernst Heinrich was Administrative Chief of the association "Haus Wettin – Albertinische Linie e.V.".

Life

Prince Ernst Heinrich of Saxony spent his childhood in Dresden, Pillnitz, and Moritzburg under the parenting of his father. The loss of his mother, who left the family permanently in 1902, affected his father and siblings very deeply, according to their own statements. Ernst Heinrich, who was only six at the time, was possibly the child who felt this loss most.

World War I 

When World War I broke out, Ernest Heinrich was first lieutenant in the 1st Royal Saxon Leib-Grenadier-Regiment Nr. 100.  In September 1914, he became batman in the General Kommando of XIX (2nd Royal Saxon) Corps at Reims and Lille. He did his Abitur during a four-month leave in 1916, then took part in the Battle of the Somme as a member of the staff of the 24th Reserve Division. On 30 August 1916, Ernst Heinrich received the Military Order of St. Henry for merit.

In the spring of 1917, he took over the leadership of the 9th Company of Reserve-Infantry Regiment No. 104 in Berezhany (in eastern Galicia). He was in the hospital for two months in 1917, after which he commanded the 9th Battery of Artillery Regiment No. 115 in the area around Ypres.

Beginning in May 1918, he led the 1st Squadron of Mounted Guard Regiments in Stary Bychow at Dnieper in Russia and, in August of the same year, he was in charge of the Saxon troops in Dorpat, Reval and Finland. In November and December 1918, Ernst Heinrich oversaw the return of Saxon troops to Germany.

1920s 
In 1919 and 1920, Ernst Heinrich learned to administer a manor in Silesia. During the Kapp Putsch in March 1920, he acted as a liaison between the putschists in Berlin and the Reichswehr in Wrocław. After the failure of the putsch, he moved to Munich, where he joined the circle around the former Crown Prince Rupprecht of Bavaria.  He married on 12 April 1921 in the Nymphenburg Palace to Sophie (14 February 1902 – 24 May 1941), the youngest sister of Charlotte, Grand Duchess of Luxembourg and of Rupprecht's wife Princess Antonia of Luxembourg. This was considered a happy marriage; they had three sons.

Ernst Heinrich did not participate in the Beer Hall Putsch on 8 and 9 November 1923 in Munich.  He rejected the Nazi ideology consistently and distanced himself from Hitler and Ludendorff. At his father's request, he took over the function of head of the administration of the association House of Wettin — Albertinische Linie e.V. His father also gave him power of attorney to negotiate with the Free State of Saxony about the future use of the manors owned by the Wettin family and their art collection. On 25 June 1925, a treaty was signed between the Free State and its former ruling dynasty, regulating the relation between the House of Wettin and the Free State, within the context of the law on the subject of 9 July 1924.

In subsequent years, Ernst Heinrich, who was an avid art lover, made several trips to Egypt with his wife and children. In 1928/29, he was approached by Gustav Stresemann of the DVP (the German People's Party), who wanted Ernst Heinrich to stand as a candidate for the federal presidency. Ernst Heinrich considered this a hopeless undertaking and declined.

Nazi era 
Ernst Heinrich opposed the Nazis after they formed a government on 30 January 1933. However, he failed to read the political situation correctly. He believed that Hitler could be stopped by the conservative political opposition and, in the spring of 1933, he joined Der Stahlhelm, hoping he could escape the influence of the Nazis. On 1 July 1934, during the Night of the Long Knives, he was arrested. He was interned in the concentration camp in Hohnstein for five days.

After his release, Ernst Heinrich retired to Moritzburg Castle in Saxony. He was an avid hunter and had to keep in touch with Nazi leaders such as Hermann Göring, who, as Master of the Hunt, was interested in the forests owned by the Wettins, and Martin Mutschmann, the Nazi governor of Saxony.  In 1938, he received King Carol II of Romania in his castle, and in 1939 he had extensive political discussions with Carl Friedrich Goerdeler, who had been mayor of Leipzig and was later active in the German resistance. A few weeks before the outbreak of World War II, Ernst Heinrich was drafted into the Abwehr group IV in Dresden.

In 1943, he openly expressed doubts that the death of his brother Georg, Crown Prince of Saxony had been an accident. The Gestapo then arrested and questioned him. However, there were no further personal consequences, as the Nazis were still reluctant to confront a member of a former royal family.

Ernst Heinrich was an admirer of the art of Käthe Kollwitz. After she lost her home when Berlin was bombed in 1943, he invited her to move to Moritzburg, where she lived and worked at the Rudenhof in the immediate vicinity of the castle, until she died in April 1945.

In February 1945, nearby Dresden was bombed. In March 1945, Ernst Heinrich fled to Sigmaringen to escape the advancing Red Army. Before he left, Ernst Heinrich and his sons buried most of their valuables in 40 crates in the Königswald forest. Most of this treasure was found by the Red Army and carried off to the Soviet Union. However, three crates full of treasure were rediscovered in 1995.

After the war 
In 1947, Ernst Heinrich married the actress Virginia Dulon (1910–2002), who styled herself Princess Virginia of Saxony after her marriage. Later that year, he purchased the Coolamber estate in Lismacaffrey (County Westmeath) in Ireland and moved there with his second wife and his sons from his first marriage. 

He died in Neckarhausen while visiting West Germany in 1971, without ever having returned to his native Saxony after the war.

Marriages and issue
Ernst Heinrich was first married to Princess Sophie of Luxembourg, sixth and youngest daughter of William IV, Grand Duke of Luxembourg and his wife Infanta Marie Anne of Portugal, on 12 April 1921 at Schloss Hohenburg. Ernst Heinrich and Sophie had three sons:

Prince Albrecht Friedrich August Johannes Gregor Dedo of Saxony (born 9 May 1922 in Munich; died 6 December 2009 in Radebeul, Germany). He never married nor had issue.
Prince Georg Timo Michael Nikolaus Maria of Saxony (born 22 December 1923 in Munich; died 22 April 1982 in Emden). He married three times:  
1st to Margrit Lucas (1923-1957) on 7 August 1952, by whom he had two children, Rüdiger Karl Ernst Timo Aldi (born 23 December 1953, pretender to the headship of the House of Saxony since 2012) and Iris Hildegard Sophie Margit Gisela (born 21 September 1955); 
2nd to Charlotte Schwindack (born 1919) in 1966 and divorced in 1973; 
3rd to Erina Eilts (1921-2010) in 1974; 
Before his marriages, he also had a son by Erika Montanus: Hubertus von Sachsen (born 25 May 1950).
Prince Rupprecht Hubertus Gero Maria of Saxony (born 12 September 1925 in Munich; died 10 April 2003 in Picton, Ontario, Canada). He never married nor had issue.

Sophie died on 24 May 1941 in Munich of pneumonia. Following her death, Ernst Heinrich married morganatically Virginia Dulon (1910-2002) on 28 June 1947 in Paris. This marriage was without issue.

Honours
 : Knight of the Order of the Black Eagle
 : Knight of the Order of the Rue Crown

Ancestry

Publications 
 Prinz Ernst Heinrich von Sachsen: Mein Lebensweg vom Königsschloss zum Bauernhof, 4th ed, Verlag der Kunst Dresden, Husum, 2010,

References

External links 

 

1896 births
1971 deaths
House of Wettin
Saxon princes
Nobility from Dresden
German emigrants to Ireland
German Roman Catholics
Albertine branch
German Army personnel of World War I
Sons of kings